Heigham is a surname. Notable people with the surname include:
Anne Heigham (c.1563–1601), English Catholic martyr
Clement Heigham (c.1495–1571), English lawyer and politician
John Heigham (c.1568–c.1634), English Roman Catholic printer, writer, and translator
Roger Heigham (c.1515–1558), English politician

Heigham, once a village and parish, is now a suburb of the city of Norwich.

See also
Higham (disambiguation)
Higham (surname)